Michał Szyba (born 18 March 1988) is a Polish handball player for KS Azoty-Puławy and the Poland men's national handball team.

He is a bronze medalist of the 2015 World Championship.

Career

National team
He debuted on the national team on 4 June 2013 in a friendly match against Sweden (27:29).

On 1 February 2015 Poland won the bronze medal of the 2015 World Championship. They won bronze medal match (29:28) against Spain. In the match for the bronze medal, he threw the goal which gave a draw and led to overtime which the Poles won.

He also participated at the 2016 Summer Olympics in Rio de Janeiro, in the men's handball tournament.

Sporting achievements

National team

World Championship
  2015 Qatar

State awards
 2015  Silver Cross of Merit

References

External links
Polish Handball Association player profile

1988 births
Living people
Sportspeople from Lublin
Polish male handball players
Expatriate handball players
Olympic handball players of Poland
Handball players at the 2016 Summer Olympics
Polish expatriate sportspeople in Switzerland
Polish expatriate sportspeople in Slovenia
Polish expatriate sportspeople in France